Maharaja Agrasen Hospital is a hospital in New Delhi, India with 400 beds. It is located in West Punjabi Bagh.

The hospital is named after Maharaja Agrasen, a king of Agroha (Haryana).

References

External links
Maharaja Agrasen Hospital

Hospitals in Delhi
Memorials to Agrasen
Year of establishment missing